Hauke is a German language surname. It stems from the male given name Hugo – and may refer to:
César Mange de Hauke (1900–1965), controversial French art dealer
Franzisca Hauke (1989), German field hockey player
Frieda Hauke (1890–1972), German politician
Friedrich Karl Emanuel Hauke (1737–1810), Polish educational theorist
Hans Moritz Hauke (1775–1830), Polish general
Józef Hauke-Bosak (1834–1871), Polish general
Max Hauke (1992), cross-country skier from Austria
Thomas A. Hauke (1938), American attorney and retired politicianr
Tobias Hauke (1987), German field hockey player

References 

German-language surnames
Surnames from given names